Salaudin Khan (born 13 December 1933) is a Ugandan former first-class cricketer.

Khan was born in Uganda Protectorate in December 1933. A figure in Ugandan cricket since the 1950s, Khan made a single appearance in first-class cricket for the East Africa cricket team against the touring Indians at Kampala in 1967. Batting twice in the match, he was run out for 15 runs in the East African first innings, while in their second innings he was dismissed for 39 runs by B. S. Chandrasekhar.

References

External links
Salaudin Khan at CricketArchive

1933 births
Living people
Ugandan people of Indian descent
Ugandan cricketers
East African cricketers